Lygia Louise Irene Kraag-Keteldijk (born 18 July 1941) is a Surinamese politician who served as Minister of Foreign Affairs in the cabinet of President Venetiaan between 2005 and 2010.

Biography
Keteldijk was born on 18 July 1941 in Paramaribo. In 1959, she graduated high school, and went to the Netherlands to study non-western sociology at the University of Utrecht. Until 1977, she worked at the Nederlands Instituut voor Maatschappelijke Opbouw (NIMO).

In 1977, Kraag-Keteldijk started to work for the Surinamese Ministry of Justice and Police. In 1981, she returned to the Netherlands to work for the Ministry of Social Affairs and Employment. On 30 April 1981, her husband died. In 2000, Kraag-Keteldijk became Director of Political Affairs in the cabinet of President Ronald Venetiaan.

On 2 September 2005, Kraag-Keteldijk was appointed Minister of Foreign Affairs and served until 12 August 2010. On 3 October 2007, she addressed the United Nations General Assembly with regards to Climate change in Suriname.

Honours
 Grand Officer of the Honorary Order of the Yellow Star.

References

1941 births
Living people
People from Paramaribo
Utrecht University alumni
Foreign ministers of Suriname
National Party of Suriname politicians
Women government ministers of Suriname
Women sociologists
Honorary Order of the Yellow Star